South Korea, as Republic of Korea, competed at the 1980 Winter Olympics in Lake Placid, United States.

Alpine skiing

Men

Cross-country skiing

Men

Figure skating

Women

Speed skating

Men

Women

References
Official Olympic Reports

Korea, South
1980
Olympics